Shri Santosh Bagrodia a politician from Indian National Congress was a Member of the Parliament of India. He represented Rajasthan in the Rajya Sabha, the upper house of the Indian Parliament till 2010.

On 6 April 2008, he became the Coal Minister of India.

Career
He worked for 20 years as a social worker and then in 1975 he started his politics career with Indian National Congress.

References

External links
 Profile on Rajya Sabha website

Indian National Congress politicians
Rajya Sabha members from Rajasthan
Rajasthani politicians
Living people
Union ministers of state of India
Year of birth missing (living people)
Indian National Congress politicians from Rajasthan